Sele Mill is a late 19th-century mill building in Hertford, England. It has been converted into apartments.
A blue plaque on the building commemorates an earlier mill on the site, the country's first paper mill.

History
For most of its history, the mill used the power of the River Beane, a chalk stream which joins the River Lea at Hertford.
A watermill on this site is mentioned in the Domesday Book of 1086 when it was valued at 2 shillings. Sele at this time was a separate manor from Hertford. Its other resources included ploughland and meadow, but it appears to appears to have been a very small settlement: the recorded population was two households.

In the late 15th century it was converted into a paper mill by an entrepreneur called John Tate.  As far as is known, this was the first paper mill in the country. It appears to have gone out of production around 1500, and the facility was used for grinding corn again. The mill was destroyed by fire in 1890 and was rebuilt. The 18th century miller's house survived the fire.

Mill race

Although water power is no longer used at the site, there is a 20th-century labyrinth weir on the River Beane designed to produce a head of water for the mill race.
There is a programme of works to improve the ecological health of the river and it has been proposed to modify the weir which in its current state poses a barrier to fish migration.

See also
 Horns Mill, Hertford

References

Buildings and structures in Hertford
Papermaking in the United Kingdom
Watermills in Hertfordshire
Watermills mentioned in the Domesday Book
Weirs on the River Beane